Gianni Clerici (24 July 1930 – 6 June 2022) was an Italian tennis commentator, journalist, and tennis player.

Clerici was born in Como, Italy. 

Clerici was known for his often off-topic banter with partner Rino Tommasi. As a tennis player one highlight of his career was being part of the main draw at Wimbledon in 1953. He is the author of several books on tennis and was inducted into the International Tennis Hall of Fame in 2006.

References
 Wertheim, L. Jon (8 September 2002). "Tennis, Italian Style". Time.
 International Tennis Hall of Fame

1930 births
2022 deaths
Italian male tennis players
Italian sports commentators
Italian sports journalists
Italian sportswriters
Sportspeople from Como
Tennis commentators
International Tennis Hall of Fame inductees
Tennis writers
20th-century Italian people